Devil's darning needle may refer to:

 Clematis virginiana, a vine native to the United States.
 Dragonfly, an insect belonging to the order Odonata.
 Crane fly, an insect resembling a mosquito but bigger, belonging to the order Diptera.
 Stick insect, an insect which resembles a stick for camouflage.

Animal common name disambiguation pages